Peter Clarke (born 8 July 1979) is a former professional tennis player from Ireland.

Clarke made the round of 16 in the boys' singles event at the 1996 Australian Open.

He appeared in seven Davis Cup ties for Ireland, playing 12 rubbers, of which he won six.

The number one ranked Irish player for much of his career, Clarke played on the ITF Men's Circuit and ATP Challenger Circuit.

Finals

Singles

Doubles

References

1979 births
Living people
Irish male tennis players
Tennis players from Dublin (city)